This is a list of diplomatic missions in Ethiopia, including those embassies posted to the country as well as to the African Union. There are 117 embassies in Addis Ababa.

Embassies in Addis Ababa

Other posts in Addis Ababa 
 (Delegation)
 (Representative office)

Gallery

Consulate General in Dire Dawa

Non-resident embassies 
In Cairo except as noted

  
 (Nairobi)

 (London)
 (Nairobi)
 (Nairobi)

 (London)
 (Pretoria)
 (Kampala)
 (Pretoria) 
 (New Delhi)

 (London)
 (Riyadh)

 (Khartoum)

 (Algiers)
 (Khartoum)
 (Singapore)
 (Nairobi)
 (Riyadh)
 (Dar es Salaam)

Former embassies 

 (closed in 1992) 
 (closed in 1982)

See also 
 Foreign relations of Ethiopia
 List of diplomatic missions of Ethiopia

References 

13. ^ https://www.embassypages.com/somaliland-representativeoffice-addisababa-ethiopia

External links 
 Ethiopian Ministry of Foreign Affairs

 

Diplomatic
Diplomatic
Ethiopia